Don't Drink the Water is a British sitcom television series produced by London Weekend Television for the ITV network.  The series was created by Ronald Chesney and Ronald Wolfe (who wrote almost every episode) and is a spin-off from their long running sitcom On the Buses.  The storyline follows Cyril Blake (Stephen Lewis) living in Spain with his sister Dorothy (Pat Coombs) after his retirement from the Luxton & District Traction Company.  Thirteen episodes were broadcast over two series from 27 July 1974 to 6 December 1975.

Episode list

Series 1

Series 2

DVD releases
Network originally included the first episode of Don't Drink the Water as an extra feature on the seventh series DVD of On the Buses, which was released on 13 November 2006. All thirteen episodes were released on a two-disc DVD by Network on 1 November 2010. All thirteen episodes were also released in a box-set on 19 September 2011 along with all seven series of On the Buses and all three film spin-offs of that series.

References

External links

1970s British sitcoms
1974 British television series debuts
1975 British television series endings
ITV sitcoms
Television shows set in Spain
British television spin-offs
On the Buses
London Weekend Television shows
Television series by ITV Studios
English-language television shows